The history of Jews in San Diego dates to the middle of the 19th century. Home to a Jewish community of around 100,000 people, around 3% of the metropolitan area's total population, San Diego has one of the largest Jewish populations in the United States.

1800s 
Louis Rose is known as one of the first Jewish citizens in San Diego, arriving in 1850. The first Jewish religious service in San Diego was held in 1851. The first congregation called, Adat Yeshurun, later changing to Beth Israel, was founded in 1861.

In the 1870s, when the town center moved, the congregation did as well. In 1871 the first Hebrew Benevolent Society was founded by Marcus Schiller. In 1889 the first Temple Beth Israel was built at Second Avenue and Beech Street. It was occupied by the congregation until 1926.

1900s 

In 1926 the Beth Israel congregation moved from the first Temple Beth Israel to a larger temple at Third and Laurel. In the 1970s, the original temple was going to be demolished but was spared due to the combined efforts of past Beth Israel President Jim Milch and other members of the congregation.

2000s 
In October of 2001 a newer temple was erected. The numbers of Jewish citizens had grown since the first congregation in 1851.

See also 
D.Z. Akin's
History of the Jews in Los Angeles
Jewish Federation of San Diego County
San Diego Jewish Academy
San Diego Jewish Film Festival
San Diego Jewish Journal
San Diego Jewish World
Torah High Schools of San Diego
History of the Jews in the American West

References 

History of San Diego
Jewish history